Lilau is a Papuan language of Papua New Guinea, closely related to Monumbo. It is spoken in Lilau ward, Almami Rural LLG, Bogia District, Madang Province.

References

Monumbo languages
Languages of Madang Province